Baruch Kurzweil (1907–1972) (Hebrew: ברוך קורצווייל) was a pioneer of Israeli literary criticism.

Biography
Kurzweil was born in Brtnice, Moravia (now Czechoslovakia) in 1907, to an Orthodox Jewish family.   He studied at Solomon Breuer's yeshiva in Frankfurt and the University of Frankfurt.  Kurzweil emigrated to Mandate Palestine in 1939.   Kurzweil taught at a high school in Haifa, where he mentored the poet Dahlia Ravikovitch and psychologist Amos Tversky.  He founded and headed Bar Ilan University's Department of Hebrew Literature until his death. He wrote a column for Haaretz newspaper.

Kurzweil committed suicide in 1972.

Thought

Kurzweil saw secular modernity (including secular Zionism) as representing a tragic, fundamental break from the premodern world.   Where before the belief in God provided a fundamental absolute of human existence, in the modern world this pillar of human life has disappeared, leaving a "void" that moderns futilely attempt to fill by exalting the individual ego.  According to Kurzweil, this discontinuity is reflected in modern Hebrew literature, which lacks the religious foundation of traditional Jewish literature: “The secularism of modern Hebrew literature is a given in that it is for the most part the outgrowth of a spiritual world divested of the primordial certainty in a sacral foundation that envelops all the events of life and measures their value.”

Kurzweil saw a writer's response to the "void" of modern existence as his most fundamental characteristic.  He believed S.Y. Agnon and Uri Zvi Grinberg were the greatest modern Hebrew writers.  A confrontational polemicist, Kurzweil famously wrote against Ahad Haam and Gershom Scholem, who he saw as attempting to establish secularism as the foundation of Jewish life.

Awards
 In 1962, Kurzweil was awarded the Bialik Prize for literature.

See also
Hebrew literature
List of Bialik Prize recipients

References

Further reading
Diamond, James S. Barukh Kurzweil and modern Hebrew literature. Chico, Calif. Scholars Pr. Brown Judaic Studies. 1983.

1907 births
1972 deaths
People from Brtnice
Israeli literary critics
Israeli Orthodox Jews
Czech Jews
Czechoslovak emigrants to Mandatory Palestine
1972 suicides
Suicides in Israel